The 2010 Boston Breakers season was the club's second season in Women's Professional Soccer and their second consecutive season in the top division of women's soccer in the American soccer pyramid. Including the WUSA franchise, it was the club's fifth year of existence.

Review and events

Match results

Key

Preseason

WPS 
Note: Results are given with Boston Breakers' score listed first.

Club

Roster 

Front office

Sources: Boston Globe, Boston Breakers

Coaching staff

Standings

Statistics

Field players

Awards

Individual Player Awards 
 Amy LePeilbet, WPS 2010 Defender of the Year

WPS Player of the Week

WPS Player of the Month

See also 
 2010 Women's Professional Soccer season
 2010 U.S. Open Cup
 2010 in American soccer
 Boston Breakers

References 

2010
American soccer clubs 2010 season
2010 Women's Professional Soccer season
Boston Breakers